Jane Lord Hersom (August 6, 1840 – November 29, 1928) was an American physician and suffragist.

Biography
Jane Lord was born in Sanford, Maine, August 6, 1840. Her father and mother, Samuel and Sophia Hight (Smith) Lord, were of English descent.

She was educated in public and private schools in Springvale, Maine, where the family had removed. She began to teach before she was sixteen, going to school in the fall and winter and teaching in the summer.

In 1865, when 25 years of age, she married Dr. Nahum Alvah Hersom (died 1881). They settled in Farmington, New Hampshire. In 1862, Dr. Hersom, entered the army as an assistant surgeon, was promoted to first surgeon, and afterwards had charge of a field hospital during the civil war.

After the war, he began a laborious country practice. His strength soon gave way so as to necessitate a vacation of five years. He then resumed work and established himself in Portland, Maine, where he soon acquired a practice which demanded all his time and energies. In 1881, Dr. Hersom went abroad for needed rest and died in Dublin, Ireland, one week after landing.

Mrs. Hersom had read medical works to her husband during his sickness, and, enjoying them, continued to read when the need was past. Her husband had been aware of her special fitness, and had often told her she would make a fine physician. The knowledge of his confidence in her abilities acted as a stimulus, and she began her studies with Prof. Stephen H. Weeks, of Portend, Maine. In 1883, she entered the Woman's Medical College of Pennsylvania in Philadelphia, studying for three years.

After her graduation from that institution, she began work in Portland. She had a large and increasing practice from the first. She was elected physician of the Temporary Home for Women and Children, in Portland, which position she held for four years, until she was obliged to resign in order to attend properly to her other duties. She was a member of the American Medical Association, and the State and County Medical Societies.In 1896, she served as president of the Pediatrics section, Maine Academy of Medicine and Science. She was also a member of the Practitioner's Club, of which she was elected president for 1892. She was a contributor of medical papers in societies and clubs and in literary clubs.

She was an active member of the Woman's Suffrage Association. She became a woman suffragist through her exigence as a student and physician. She served as treasurer of the Maine State Woman's Suffrage Association, and president of the Portland Equal Suffrage Club.

In religion, Hersom was a Congregationalist; in politics, a Republican. She was a member of the Civic Club, Woman's Literary Union, and Monday Club.

Personal life
The Hersoms had two children, a daughter, Mabel Lord (Mrs. Rufus Harton Jones), and a child who died in infancy.

She died at Portland, Maine, November 29, 1928.

References

Attribution

External links
 
 

1840 births
Wikipedia articles incorporating text from A Woman of the Century
19th-century American physicians
20th-century American physicians
20th-century American women physicians
American suffragists
People from Sanford, Maine
Physicians from Maine
Activists from Portland, Maine
1928 deaths